The Gold State Coach is an enclosed, eight-horse-drawn carriage used by the British Royal Family. Commissioned in 1760 by Francis Rawdon-Hastings, 1st Marquess of Hastings for King George III, and designed by Sir William Chambers, it was built in the London workshops of Samuel Butler. It was commissioned for £7,562 (£3.54 million = US$4.188 million in 2022, adjusted for inflation). It was completed in 1762.

This coach has been used at the coronation of every British monarch since George IV. The coach's great age, weight, and lack of manoeuvrability have limited its use to grand state occasions such as coronations, royal weddings, and the jubilees of a monarch. Until the Second World War, the coach was the monarch's usual transport to and from Parliament at the State Opening.
      
The coach is housed at the Royal Mews of Buckingham Palace. It is on view for the public.

Description

It is gilded and features painted panels by Giovanni Battista Cipriani and rich gilded sculpture including three cherubs on the roof (representing England, Ireland and Scotland) and four tritons, one at each corner (representing Britain's imperial power). The body of the coach is slung by braces covered with Morocco leather and decorated with gilt buckles. The interior is lined with velvet and satin. The sculptor Sir Joseph Wilton produced the elaborate carvings on the coach. The roof supports three cherubs representing the union of England, Scotland and Ireland. They carry the Imperial Crown and hold the sword, sceptre and the badge representing Knighthood. The branches of eight gilded palm trees frame the roof. Four corner trees rise from a lion's head and are decorated with symbols of Britain's victory in the Seven Years' War with France. The war was drawing to a close when the coach was built in 1762. Morocco leather straps support the body of the coach and are held by four Triton, mythical sea-gods with a man's head and a dolphin's tail. At the front wheels, the tritons seem to be using the straps to pull the coach. They are blowing conchs, trumpet-like shells to herald the arrival of the Monarch of the Ocean. Gilded dolphins hold in place the bar by which the coach is drawn, and the driver's foot board (no longer used) is in the shape of a scallop shell. The two tritons at the back carry imperial symbols, representing Britain's maritime traditions and status as a dominant sea power.

The carvings give the Gold Coach the air of a triumphant chariot, reflecting Britain's powerful position in the world at the time.

The Gold State Coach is pulled by a team of eight horses wearing the Red Morocco harness. Originally driven by a coachman, the eight horses are now postilion-ridden in four pairs. The coach is so heavy it can only be pulled at a walk. The coach has (gilded) brakes, which are operated by the grooms.

As the coach is suspended from braces, it lacks more modern comfort. Modern coaches such as the Australian State Coach and the Diamond Jubilee State Coach have electric windows, heating and hydraulic stabilizers.

In the words of King William IV, a former naval officer, being driven in the Gold State Coach was like being on board a ship "tossing in a rough sea". Queen Victoria complained of the "distressing oscillation" of the cabin. She would often refuse to ride in the Gold State Coach. A later monarch, King George VI said that his journey from the palace to Westminster Abbey for his coronation was "one of the most uncomfortable rides I have ever had in my life". He had the coach overhauled after the Second World War to rubberize the iron-bound wheels. This would afford at least some comfort to the passengers. Queen Elizabeth II referred to her coronation journey in the coach as "horrible" and "not very comfortable", which is possibly why it was not used for her Diamond Jubilee when she was aged 86, having previously featured in her Silver and Golden Jubilee celebrations. It was brought back as part of a pageant for her Platinum Jubilee celebrations,  Peppers Ghost waving to crowds from the coach.

The coach is managed by four postilions, nine walking grooms (one of whom walks behind the coach), six footmen, and four Yeoman of the Guard carrying their long partisans. Eight of the grooms walk beside the horses. The more ornately dressed footmen walk beside the body of the coach. The postilions have to handle the horses when the animals are unruly, and they carry crooked walking-sticks to hold up the traces that may become slack when the coach is taking a corner. The royal coachmen are traditionally clean-shaven. The horses are always Windsor Greys.

See also
State Coach (disambiguation) - Other state coaches

References

External links

Description from CNN of the Gold State Coach

1762 works
British monarchy
Works by Scottish people
Royal carriages
Vehicles of the United Kingdom
Gold in the United Kingdom
Coaches (carriage)
George III of the United Kingdom